Grey white-eye may refer to:

 Grey-brown white-eye, Zosterops cinereus of Micronesia
 Réunion grey white-eye, Zosterops borbonicus
 Mauritius grey white-eye, Zosterops mauritianus

Animal common name disambiguation pages